The North Side (Denver) is a region in Denver County. It is also known as North Denver. The neighborhoods located within Denver's North Side are Sloan's Lake, West Highland, Berkeley, Regis, Chaffee Park, Sunnyside, Highland, and Jefferson Park.

Geography
The North Side of Denver is bordered by East Wheat Ridge, Edgewater, and Edgewood to the west, Northeast Lakewood/Molholm Two Creeks to the southwest, West Colfax to the south, Downtown Denver to the east, Arvada, Westminster, and Twin Lakes to the north.

Demographics
The current population of all neighborhoods in North Denver are 67,225 people, with 26,501 housing units. The racial makeup of the Northwest side of Denver all together is 40.13% non Hispanic-white, 1.41% African American, 1.23% Asian, and 0.85% Native American. Hispanic or Latino of any race are 56.38% of the population.

The median household income for the region/area is $44,546. About 16.51% of the population is under the poverty line. 41.84% of the population in the Northwest side of Denver is renters. Roughly 6.91% of the housing is public housing.

Education
There are many elementary school options on Denver's northwest side. The two middle schools of choice are Skinner Middle and Lake Middle. North High School is the main high school of choice.

List of North West Side (Denver) Neighborhoods
Sloan's Lake
Highland
West Highland
Sunnyside
Chaffee Park
Jefferson Park
Regis
Berkeley

Parks
There are several parks located on the north west side of Denver, such as Sloans Lake park, Hallack Park, Jefferson Park, Osceola and 29th Park, Viking Park, Highland Park, Pferdsteller Park, Hirshorn Park, Berkeley Park, Rocky Mountain Park, McDonough Park, La Raza Park, Ciancio Park, Chaffee Park, Pecos and 46th Park, Zuni and 51st Park, and Berkeley Hills Park.

See also
North Denver
Northeast Denver

References 

Denver metropolitan area
Regions of Colorado